MTM may refer to:

Computing
 Microsoft Test Manager, a diagnostic software tool

Science, technology, medicine and engineering
 Medication Therapy Management, pharmaceutical care by pharmacists
 Methods-time measurement, a motion time system
 Methyltrimethoxysilane, an organosilicon compound
 Midwoofer-tweeter-midwoofer, a loudspeaker configuration
 Model–test–model, in military combat modelling
 Modified Transverse Mercator coordinate system, used in Eastern Canada
 Motoren Technik Mayer, Wettstetten, Germany, a car tuner
 Mountaintop removal mining
 Methylthiomethyl ether
 Myotubular myopathy or centronuclear myopathy, a muscle disorder
 Massive Thirring Model, in quantum field theory
 Mark-to-market accounting, or fair value accounting

Entertainment 

 MTM Enterprises, Mary Tyler Moore's production company
 MTM Records, a MTM Enterprises record label
 MTM (band), a Portuguese band

Other
 Media Technology Monitor (MTM), a Canadian survey
 Momentum (technical analysis), a financial indicator
 Monster Truck Madness, a racing video game
 Ibanez MTM, a guitars brand
 Made to measure clothing 
 Mark-to-market accounting in economics
 Minnesota Transportation Museum, US
 MT explosive motorboat, Italian, WWII
 Max the Mutt College of Animation, Art & Design, Canada
Metro Trains Melbourne
The Swedish Agency for Accessible Media, abbreviated as MTM for

See also
 M2M (disambiguation)